Campbelltown-Camden District Cricket Club (also known as the Ghosts) is a cricket club in New South Wales, Australia.

History

The club was formed in 1985 and won its first title (the first grade limited overs crown) in 1986-87. Since then, it has won other lower grade titles. 

Players of note include Ian Davis, Brett Lee, Shane Lee, Michael Bevan, Corey Richards, Winston Davis, Derek Pringle, Mark Stoneman, Monty Panesar and Ollie Pope.

Cricket
The Ghosts home ground is in Raby, New South Wales and they play in the Sydney Grade Cricket competition.

External links
 

Sydney Grade Cricket clubs
Cricket clubs established in 1985
1985 establishments in Australia
Campbelltown, New South Wales
Camden, New South Wales